Carlos Matías Sandes Steinmetz, commonly known as Matías Sandes (born June 14, 1984) is an Argentine-Italian professional basketball player. He currently plays with the Argentine club Boca Juniors. Sandes has also represented the senior Argentina national basketball team. He plays mainly at the power forward position, but he can also played as a small forward and center.

Professional career
Sandes began his pro career spending five years with Boca Juniors in the Argentine League.  While Sandes was a member of Boca Juniors, they won the Argentine League championship (2003–04), four Argentine Cups (2002, 2003, 2004, 2005), and three consecutive South American Club Championships (2004, 2005, 2006). Sandes also played three seasons (2007–08, 2008–09, 2009–10) with Fuenlabrada of the Spanish Liga ACB.

National team career

Argentine junior national team
With Argentina's junior national teams, Sandes played at the 2003 FIBA Under-19 World Cup, and at the 2005 FIBA Under-21 World Cup.

Argentine senior national team
Sandes has also represented the senior Argentina national basketball team. He made his senior national team debut at the 2006 FIBA South American Championship, where he won a bronze medal.  With the senior Argentina national team, he also won a silver medal at the 2007 FIBA AmeriCup, and a bronze medal at the 2009 FIBA AmeriCup, where he averaged 3.6 points and 2.8 rebounds per game, in nine games of action. Sandes also won a silver medal at the 2010 FIBA South American Championship, and a gold medal at the 2012 FIBA South American Championship.

He also played with Argentina at the 2007 Marchand Continental Cup, the 2009 Marchand Continental Cup, and the 2019 FIBA Americas World Cup qualification.

Personal life
Sandes was born in Mendoza, Argentina. Sandes' cousin, Ezequiel Bullaude, is a professional footballer.

References

External links
FIBA.com Profile
Spanish League Profile 
Latinbasket.com Profile
ProBallers.com Profile

1984 births
Living people
Argentine expatriate basketball people in Spain
Argentine men's basketball players
Basketball players at the 2007 Pan American Games
Basketball players at the 2011 Pan American Games
Baloncesto Fuenlabrada players
Boca Juniors basketball players
Centers (basketball)
Gimnasia y Esgrima de Comodoro Rivadavia basketball players
Italian expatriate basketball people in Spain
Italian men's basketball players
Juventud Sionista basketball players
Liga ACB players
Pan American Games competitors for Argentina
Power forwards (basketball)
Quimsa basketball players
San Lorenzo de Almagro (basketball) players
Saski Baskonia players
Small forwards
Sportspeople from Mendoza, Argentina